Michael Brandner may refer to:

 Michael Brandner (footballer) (born 1995), Austrian footballer
 Michael Brandner (actor) (born 1951), German actor